Peter Mews (25 March 1619 – 9 November 1706) was an English Royalist theologian and bishop. He was a captain captured at Naseby and he later had discussions in Scotland for the Royalist cause. Later made a Bishop he would report on non-conformist families.

Life
Mews was born at Caundle Purse in Dorset, and was educated at the Merchant Taylors' School, London, and at St John's College, Oxford, of which he was scholar and fellow.

When the Civil War broke out in 1642, Mews joined the Royalist army, and, having been made a captain, was taken prisoner at Naseby; but he was soon released and in 1648 sought refuge in Holland. He became friendly with King Charles I's secretary, Sir Edward Nicholas, and being skilful at disguising himself was very useful to the Royalists during the rule of Oliver Cromwell, undertaking two journeys to Scotland in 1653. In August of that year, his friend Nicholas applied to Mary, Princess Royal and Princess of Orange, to use her influence to get Mews a post as reader in philosophy at the Orange College of Breda, but had a reply from Hyde that the place called for a man "that hath not bene a truant from his bookes".

Before this Mews had been ordained. Taking the degree of DCL and regaining his fellowship at Oxford after the Restoration, he became Archdeacon of Huntingdon, vicar of St Mary's, Reading, and chaplain to the King; then, having obtained two other livings, he was made canon of Windsor, canon of St David's, and Archdeacon of Berkshire (1665–1672).

In 1667, when at Breda arranging peace between England and the Dutch Republic, he was chosen President of St John's College, Oxford, in succession to his father-in-law, Richard Baylie, afterwards becoming Vice-Chancellor of the University of Oxford and dean of Rochester. He was appointed Bishop of Bath and Wells in 1672. He used his position to report on well-to-do non-conformist families. He gave Mary Speke and her family particular attention. 

Mews resigned his presidency at Oxford University in 1673, and in 1684 he was elected Bishop of Winchester, a position which this "old, honest cavalier," as Thomas Hearne calls him, filled until his death. The bishop is buried in Winchester Cathedral.

Mews lent his carriage horses to pull the cannon at a critical moment during the Battle of Sedgemoor, where he was wounded whilst accompanying the royal army. He was, however, in sympathy with the Seven Bishops, and was only prevented by illness from attending their meeting; and as visitor of Magdalen College, Oxford, he supported the fellows in their resistance to James II, admitted their nominee, John Hough, to the presidency, and restored the ejected fellows in October 1688.

He took the oaths to William III and Mary II in 1689. In the absence of Henry Compton, Bishop of London, Mews took the chief part at the consecration of John Tillotson as Archbishop of Canterbury in 1691.

A portrait is displayed in the Great Hall of the 15th-century manor house, Athelhampton Hall, known as Athelhampton House, just a few miles outside Dorchester in Dorset.

References

Further reading
 Stephen Hyde Cassan, Lives of the Bishops of Winchester, 1827.
 George F. Warner (ed.), Nicholas Papers, 1886–1897.

Sources
 
 
 

1619 births
1706 deaths
People from North Dorset District
People educated at Merchant Taylors' School, Northwood
Alumni of St John's College, Oxford
English Christian theologians
English chaplains
Presidents of St John's College, Oxford
People associated with Magdalen College, Oxford
Vice-Chancellors of the University of Oxford
Bishops of Bath and Wells
Bishops of Winchester
17th-century Church of England bishops
Cavaliers
Canons of Windsor
Deans of Rochester
English male non-fiction writers